USS Garrard (APA-84) was a  that served with the United States Navy from 1945 to 1946. She was scrapped in 1963.

History
Garrard was named after Garrard County, Kentucky. She was laid down under Maritime Commission contract by Consolidated Steel at Wilmington, Los Angeles on 28 October 1944. Launched 13 January 1945, acquired by the Navy 2 March 1945 and commissioned at San Pedro 3 March 1945.

World War II
After shakedown and amphibious training along the California Coast, Garrard embarked sailors and Army Aviation Engineers and departed Seattle 3 May for the Western Pacific. Steaming via Pearl Harbor, Eniwetok, and Guam, she arrived Ulithi, Carolines, 28 May.

Invasion of Okinawa

She sailed 20 June for Okinawa and reached Hagushi Beach the 24th. As her gunners helped repel Japanese air attacks, she landed men and cargo of the 854th Aviation Engineers before departing for Leyte, Philippine Islands, 28 June.

Garrard embarked fleet replacements, loaded cargo and mail, and departed 8 July as a logistics support ship to supply the 3d Fleet off the Japanese coast. She rendezvoused 17 July; and, after completing transfer of men and cargo by highline, she sailed 22 July for Eniwetok, where she arrived the 26th.

After hostilities
After serving as a receiving ship, Garrard departed 13 August to once more carry men and cargo to the 3rd Fleet. She rendezvoused 17 August, embarked sailors and marines at sea for occupation duty in Japan, then steamed for Japan 20 August with Task Force 31. Arriving Tokyo Bay 27 August, she debarked her troops at Yokosuka 30 August. Between 10 and 15 September she steamed to Sendai, Japan, and back to transport liberated prisoners of war. After embarking 726 veterans, she departed Yokosuka 13 October and sailed to the United States, where she arrived Portland, Oregon, 25 October.

Operation Magic Carpet
Assigned to Operation Magic Carpet, the massive sealift to take demobilizing soldiers home, Garrard departed San Francisco for the Philippines 19 November. Reaching Manila 11 December, she embarked 905 homebound troops and sailed for San Francisco 14 December. Arriving 3 January 1946, she entered Mare Island Naval Shipyard before sailing for Seattle 6 February.

Decommissioning
After completing an inactivation overhaul at Puget Sound Naval Shipyard, she decommissioned at Bellingham, Washington, 21 May 1946. Transferred to the War Shipping Administration on 29 June, she entered the National Defense Reserve Fleet at Olympia, Washington. She was sold to Zidell Exploration Company Inc. of Portland, Oregon, for scrapping 3 June 1963. The ship was de-constructed and the metal was used to build several large barges for exploration uses by Zidell Exploration Company. The remainder of the ships metal and other materials were sold to several private corporations.

Garrard received two battle stars for World War II service.

References

USS Garrard (APA-84), Navsource Online.

Gilliam-class attack transports
Transports of the United States Navy
World War II auxiliary ships of the United States
World War II amphibious warfare vessels of the United States
USS Garrard APA-84
Ships built in Los Angeles
1945 ships